Stabroek was the old name of Georgetown, Guyana, between 1784 and 1812, and was the capital of Demerara. Stabroek is currently a ward in the centre of Georgetown.

History
In 1748, Governor Laurens Storm van 's Gravesande build a guard post at the mouth of the Demerara River. Later English planters started to build houses around the guard post creating a little village. The town was established in 1782 during a brief occupation by the French of the Dutch colony of Demerara. The original name of Longchamps was changed to Stabroek in 1784, after Nicholaas Geelvinck (1732 — 1787), Lord of Stabroek, the then President of the Dutch West India Company. 

In 1789, the population was 780 people of which 239 were whites, however the town rapidly started to grow and by 1807 had a population of around 8,500 people. American traders started to built a wharf which became known as American Stelling, and little towns started to appear around the main settlement.

The city's name changed again in 1812 when, under British rule, it became Georgetown. A ward of the city, one fourth of a mile broad and one mile long, retains the name Stabroek.

Brickdam, Stabroek's main street, was paved with bricks and made of burnt earth until 1921 when it was paved over for the arrival of the Prince of Wales.  The upper side of Brickdam was once lined with palm trees.

The old name of the city is still reflected in Georgetown's main market,  Stabroek Market, which has existed on or near its present location since the 18th century, and the newspaper Stabroek News, established in 1986. The Parliament Building is located in Stabroek on the same spot where the Court of Policy used to be.

Gallery

References

Bibliography

External links
Aerial view
The Growth of Georgetown

Demerara
History of Guyana
Tourist attractions in Guyana
Wards of Georgetown, Guyana